Chaiti are semi-classical songs, originating from the Indian subcontinent, sung in the Hindu calendar month of Chait. These songs are rendered during the Holy month of Sri Rama Navami in March/April. It falls under light classical form of Hindustani classical music. The songs typically have the name of Lord Rama.

It comes in the series of season songs, like Kajari, Hori, and Sawani, and is traditionally sung in the villages and towns of Uttar Pradesh: around Banaras, Mirzapur, Mathura, Allahabad, and the Bhojpur regions of Bihar. Girija Devi is among the popular singers of Chaiti.

References

Indian styles of music
Hindustani music genres
Uttar Pradesh folklore
Culture of Bihar
Hindustani music terminology